Gjon Nikollë Kazazi (in Latin: Giovanni Battista Nicolovich Casasi) was an Albanian Catholic cleric, who served as Archbishop of the Diocese of Skopje, known for discovering Meshari of Gjon Buzuku.

Biography

Monsignor Gjon Nikollë Kazazi was born on 1 January 1702, in Yakova, Ottoman Empire.   He finished elementary school in Yakova, at 18 he continued theological studies at Illyric College of St. Peter in Fermo and graduated in 1727 at Illyric College of Loreto, in which he studied philosophy, rhetoric and grammar, in 1727 he got the title of doctor of philosophy and theology. After graduating he became a priest, in 1743 he became Archbishop of Shkup In 1740 he discovered Meshari of Gjon Buzuku. Monsignor Kazazi was the first Albanian researcher in Vatican Secret Archives. Kazaz also referred to detecting fever medicine against disease. He died and was buried in his hometown.

References

Bishops of Skopje
Albanian Roman Catholic archbishops
Albanian language
1702 births
1752 deaths
18th-century Roman Catholic archbishops in the Ottoman Empire
People from Gjakova